The geography of Argentina describes the geographic features of Argentina, a country located in the Southern Cone of South America.  Bordered by the Andes in the west and the South Atlantic Ocean to the east, its neighbouring countries are Chile to the west, Bolivia and Paraguay to the north, and Brazil and Uruguay to the northeast.

In terms of area, Argentina is the second largest country of South America after Brazil, and the 8th largest country in the world. Argentina claims a section of Antarctica (Argentine Antarctica) that is subject to the Antarctic Treaty. Argentina also asserts claims to several British South Atlantic islands.

With a population of more than 42.1 million, Argentina ranks as the world's 32nd most populous country as of 2010.

Regions

Argentina's provinces are divided in 7 zones regarding climate and terrain. From North to South, West to East:
 Argentine Northwest: Jujuy, Salta, Tucumán, Catamarca, La Rioja
 Gran Chaco: Formosa, Chaco, Santiago del Estero
 Mesopotamia: Misiones, Corrientes
 Cuyo: San Juan, Mendoza, San Luis
 The Pampas: Santa Fe, La Pampa, Buenos Aires, Córdoba, Entre Ríos
 Patagonia: Rio Negro, Neuquén, Chubut, Santa Cruz, Tierra del Fuego

Land use
 Arable land: 13.9%
 Permanent crops: 0.4%
 Permanent pastures: 39.6%
 Forest: 10.7%
 Other: 35.4% (2020)
 Irrigated land: 23,600 km2 (2020)
 Total renewable water resources: 814 km3/yr

Mountains and hills

Water resources 

In Argentina, the fluvial net is integrated by many systems of different economic relevance, which could be measured by their amount of flow and navigability. Water flow relevance is based on its potential to be used for irrigation and as a source of energy. Depending on where the water streams drain, rivers and creeks could be classified into three different kinds of watersheds:
 Open or exorheic watersheds: they have exterior drainage (into the sea) - Parana River, Uruguay River, Negro River
 Closed or endorheic watersheds: they have interior drainage - Atuel River, Diamante River, Tunuyan River
 Areic watersheds: they lack of drainage and could be found in the center-west of the chaquenean plain, on the west of the pampean region and in some patagonic areas

On the other hand, lakes and lagoons are permanent accumulations of water over impervious depressions. Their difference is mainly based on their extension and depth. They are very important for stream regulation, as a source of energy, tourist attraction and its ichthyologic wealth. In Argentina, all major lakes are in Patagonia (Carlevari and Carlevari, 2007).

Rivers

Major rivers in Argentina include the Pilcomayo, Paraguay, Bermejo, Colorado, Río Negro, Salado, Uruguay and the largest river, the Paraná. The latter two flow together before meeting the Atlantic Ocean, forming the estuary of the Río de la Plata. Regionally important rivers are the Atuel and Mendoza in the homonymous province, the Chubut in Patagonia, the Río Grande in Jujuy, and the San Francisco River in Salta.

Lakes

There are several large lakes in Argentina, many of them in Patagonia. Among these are lakes Argentino and Viedma in Santa Cruz, Nahuel Huapi in Río Negro and Fagnano in Tierra del Fuego, and Colhué Huapi and Musters in Chubut. Lake Buenos Aires and O'Higgins/San Martín Lake are shared with Chile. Mar Chiquita, Córdoba, is the largest salt water lake in the country. There are numerous reservoirs created by dams. Argentina features various hot springs, such as those at Termas de Río Hondo with temperatures between 30 °C and 65 °C.

A recent global remote sensing analysis suggested that there were 3,091 km2 of tidal flats in Argentina, making it the 9th ranked country in terms of how much tidal flat occurs there.

Climate

Argentina is subject to a variety of climates. The north of the country, including latitudes in and below the Tropic of Capricorn, is characterized by very hot, wet summers (which result in a lot of swamp lands) with mild drier winters, and is subject to periodic droughts during the winter season.

Central Argentina has hot summers with tornadoes and thunderstorms (in western Argentina producing some of the world's largest hail), and cool winters. The southern regions have warm summers and cold winters with heavy snowfall, especially in mountainous zones. Higher elevations at all latitudes experience cooler conditions.

Political geography

Argentina borders five countries.

International agreements:
 Party to: Antarctic-Environmental Protocol, Antarctic-Marine Living Resources, Antarctic Seals, Antarctic Treaty, Biodiversity, Climate Change,  Climate Change-Kyoto Protocol, Desertification, Endangered Species, Environmental Modification, Hazardous Wastes, Law of the Sea, Marine Dumping, Nuclear Test Ban, Ozone Layer Protection, Ship Pollution, Wetlands, Whaling
 Signed, but not ratified: Marine Life Conservation

Strategic importance:
 Location relative to sea lanes between South Atlantic and South Pacific Oceans (Strait of Magellan, Beagle Channel, Drake Passage)

Territorial claims
 Land claims
 Falkland Islands
 South Georgia and the South Sandwich Islands
 Argentine Antarctica
Desert Lake
 Maritime claims on Argentine Sea
 Territorial sea: 
 Contiguous zone: 
 Exclusive economic zone: 
 Continental shelf:  or to the edge of the continental margin
 Elevation:

National parks

The National Parks of Argentina make up a network of thirty national parks in Argentina. The parks cover a very varied set of terrains and biotopes, from Baritú National Park on the northern border with Bolivia to Tierra del Fuego National Park in the far south of the continent (see List of national parks of Argentina).

The creation of the National Parks dates back to the 1903 donation of 73 square kilometers of land in the Lake District in the Andes foothills by Francisco Moreno. This formed the nucleus of a larger protected area in Patagonia around San Carlos de Bariloche. In 1934, a law was passed creating the National Parks system, formalizing the protected area as the Nahuel Huapi National Park and creating the Iguazú National Park. The National Park Police Force was born, enforcing the new laws preventing tree-felling and hunting. Their early task was largely to establish national sovereignty over these disputed areas and to protect borders.

Five further national parks were declared in 1937 in Patagonia and the service planned new towns and facilities to promote tourism and education. Six more were declared by 1970.

In 1970 a new law established new categories of protection, so that there now were National Parks, National Monuments, Educational Reserves and Natural Reserves. Three national parks were declared in the 1970s. In 1980, another new law affirmed the status of national parks - this law is still in place. The 1980s saw the service reaching out to local communities and local government to help in the running and development of the national parks. Ten more national parks were created with local co-operation, sometimes at local instigation. In 2000, Mburucuyá and Copo National Parks were declared, and El Leoncito natural reserve was upgraded to a national park.

The headquarters of the National Park Service are in downtown Buenos Aires, on Santa Fe Avenue. A library and information center are open to the public. The administration also covers the national monuments, such as the Petrified Forest, and natural and educational reserves.

See also
 List of islands of Argentina
 List of volcanoes in Argentina
 Protected areas of Argentina

References

Bibliography
 
 
 UT Perry–Castañeda Map - Argentina Map Website Map
 Carlevari I. y R. Carlevari. 2007. La Argentina. Geografía económica y humana.14° edición. Alfaomega grupo editor. 543 pp.